A siege hook is a weapon used to pull stones from a wall during a siege. The method used was to penetrate the protective wall with the hook and then retract it, pulling away some of the wall with it. 

The Greek historian Polybius, in his Histories, mentions the use of such weapons at the Roman siege of Ambracia:

References

Siege equipment
Ancient Roman siege warfare